The GR 4 is a long-distance walking route of the Grande Randonnée network in France. The route connects Royan with Grasse.

Along the way, the route passes through:
 Royan
 Saintes
 Montbron
 Aixe-sur-Vienne
 Aubusson
 Mont-Dore
 Les Vans
 Manosque
 Grasse

References

External links
 GR4 From the Atlantic to the Mediterranean (Full itinerary)

Hiking trails in France